The School Nurse Files is a South Korean streaming television series starring Jung Yu-mi and Nam Joo-hyuk. Based on the 2015 award-winning novel School Nurse Ahn Eun-young by Chung Serang, it was released on Netflix on September 25, 2020.

Synopsis
Ahn Eun-young is a school nurse with the power to see human desires, feelings, and spirits that exist in the form of "jellies". Some of these jellies can take on dangerous, monstrous forms. Ahn is appointed to a new high school where mysterious incidents are taking place. Along with a fellow teacher, Hong In-pyo, a man with a special energy field around him that protects him from jellies, she tries to solve these mysterious cases.

Cast

Main
 Jung Yu-mi as Ahn Eun-young, a school nurse who can see jellies
 Nam Joo-hyuk as Hong In-pyo, a Classical Chinese teacher with a special energy field protecting him from jellies

Supporting
 Lee Joo-young as Han Ah-reum, Life Sciences teacher.
 Kim Mi-soo as Hwang Ga-young, In-pyo's elementary school classmate.
 Go Youn-jung as Choi Yoo-jin
 Teo Yoo as Mr. Mackenzie, English teacher.

Monglyeon High School Students
 Park Hye-Eun as Sung A-ra “Jellyfish”
 Lee Suk-hyung as Min-woo, student.
 Choi Joon-young as Kim Kang-sun, Eun-young's middle school classmate.
 Hyun Woo-seok as Seung-kwon, student.
 Kwon Young-chan as Lee Ji-hyung, student.
 Park Se-jin as Jang Radi, student.
 Song Hee-jun as Baek Hye-min, student.
 Shim Dal-gi as Heo Wan-soo, student.

Special appearances
 Lee Jong-won as Student.
 Jeon Gook-hwan as Hong Jin-beom, Monglyeon High School founder and In-pyo's grandfather.
 Moon So-ri as Hwa-soo, director of acupuncture institute and Eun-young's friend.

Episodes

Season 1 (2020)

Production

Development
On December 19, 2018, Netflix announced that it would produce a 6-part adaptation of the South Korean novel School Nurse Ahn Eun-young. Its author, Chung Serang, wrote the series, while Lee Kyoung-mi, who previously wrote and directed an episode of the anthology series Persona for the streaming platform, served as the director. The series is produced for Netflix by KeyEast.

Casting
It was revealed that Jung Yu-mi would portray the titular role when Netflix announced the commission of the series. On March 8, 2019, Nam Joo-hyuk was confirmed to have joined the main cast.

Filming
Filming took place during mid 2019.

Release
On August 14, 2020, it was announced that the series would be released on September 25.

References

External links
 
 
 
The School Nurse Files Review at juskorea

Korean-language Netflix original programming
2020 South Korean television series debuts
2020 South Korean television series endings
South Korean comedy television series
South Korean fantasy television series
Television shows based on South Korean novels
Television series by KeyEast
Television series by Oh! Boy Project
South Korean pre-produced television series